The 2019 North American and Caribbean Senior Club Championship  was the first edition of the North American and Caribbean Senior Club Championship which is a qualifying tournament for the 2019 IHF Super Globe. It was held in Lake Placid, United States at the United States Olympic Training Center from 9 to 12 May 2019.

Venue
The championship was played in Lake Placid, at the United States Olympic Training Center (LPOTC).

Teams

Following teams participated at the qualifying tournament.

Cancellation by Río Grande

Referees

Results

All times are local (UTC-4).

Statistics

Team

Awards 

Source:

Top Scorers

Most penalties

Minimum 1 red card or 2 × 2 minutes

References

External links
Official website

2019
North American and Caribbean Senior Club Championship
North American and Caribbean Senior Club Championship
International handball competitions hosted by the United States
North American and Caribbean Senior Club Championship